Spectrin, beta, non-erythrocytic 4, also known as SPTBN4, is a protein that in humans is encoded by the SPTBN4 gene.

Spectrin is an actin crosslinking and molecular scaffold protein that links the cell membrane to the actin cytoskeleton, and functions in the determination of cell shape, arrangement of transmembrane proteins, and organization of organelles. It is composed of two antiparallel dimers of alpha- and beta- subunits. This gene is one member of a family of beta-spectrin genes. The encoded protein localizes to the nuclear matrix, PML nuclear bodies, and cytoplasmic vesicles. A highly similar gene in the mouse is required for localization of specific membrane proteins in polarized regions of neurons. Multiple transcript variants encoding different isoforms have been found for this gene.

Interactions 

SPTBN4 has been shown to interact with PTPRN and DISC1.

References

Further reading